Briercliffe is a civil parish in the borough of Burnley, Lancashire, England.  The parish contains 21 buildings that are recorded in the National Heritage List for England as designated listed buildings.   Of these, one is listed at Grade I, the highest of the three grades, two at Grade II*, the middle grade, and the others are at Grade II, the lowest grade.

Until the 19th century, the parish was rural, and most of the older listed buildings originated as farmhouses or farm buildings.  The other listed buildings from this period include a medieval cross base, a country house that is now in ruins, and a packhorse bridge.  The cotton industry arrived in the parish in the middle of the 19th century, and its western part became a suburb of Burnley.  The listed buildings from the later period are a parish church, and two cotton weaving mills.

Key

Buildings

References

Citations

Sources

Lists of listed buildings in Lancashire
Buildings and structures in Burnley